Ferree Covered Bridge was a historic covered bridge located near Rushville, Rush County, Indiana. It was built in 1873 by Archibald M. Kennedy and his son Emmett. The bridge had square portals with articulated corners. The bridge was destroyed by an arsonist on February 13, 1989

It was listed on the U.S. National Register of Historic Places in 1983, as part of a multiple property submission covering six bridges built by the Kennedy family firm.  It was delisted in 1990.

References

Former National Register of Historic Places in Indiana
Covered bridges on the National Register of Historic Places in Indiana
Bridges completed in 1873
Bridges in Rush County, Indiana
National Register of Historic Places in Rush County, Indiana
Road bridges on the National Register of Historic Places in Indiana
Wooden bridges in Indiana
Burr Truss bridges in the United States
1873 establishments in Indiana